Larkinella insperata  is a Gram-negative bacterium from the genus of Larkinella.

References

External links
Type strain of Larkinella insperata at BacDive -  the Bacterial Diversity Metadatabase

Cytophagia
Bacteria described in 2006